Leszno  is a village in the administrative district of Gmina Grabów, within Łęczyca County, Łódź Voivodeship, in central Poland.

History
In the late 19th century, the village had a population of 149.

During the German occupation of Poland (World War II), in 1940, the German gendarmerie carried out expulsions of Poles, whose houses and farms were then handed over to German colonists as part of the Lebensraum policy.

References

Villages in Łęczyca County